HFT may refer to:
 Hammerfest Airport, in Norway
 Harbor Freight Tools, an American retailer
 High-flow therapy, a method of delivering respiratory gases
 High-frequency trading, type of algorithmic trading
 Hoh Fuk Tong stop (MTR station code), in Hong Kong
 Human Friendly Transmission, a motorcycle transmission
 Hunter Field Target, a target shooting sport
 hft a learning disability charity in the United Kingdom
 Hardware Fault Tolerance in IEC 61508
 Himalayan Frontal Thrust, a geologic fault